The 2007 Pacific Games men's football tournament was held at the Toleafoa J.S. Blatter Complex in Apia, Samoa in from 25 August to 7 September 2007.

The men's tournament formed the first stage of the Oceania Football Confederation's (OFC) qualification tournament for the 2010 FIFA World Cup and the qualification tournament for the 2008 OFC Nations Cup.

Tournament 
The final accredited athlete list at the SPG website  shows 10 entered sides. Papua New Guinea, although listed by FIFA as having applied for the 2010 World Cup, did not enter. Tuvalu did enter (although they were not eligible for the World Cup). The group stage draw, undertaken by Tim Cahill, was held on 12 June 2007 in Auckland, New Zealand.

New Caledonia's captain, Pierre Wajoka scored a ninth-minute penalty against Tahiti in the opening fixture of the games, earning him the distinction of being the scorer of the first goal of the 2010 FIFA World Cup qualification process.

Group seedings 

Notes:
 Tuvalu was unranked by FIFA as it was not a member (and not an entrant to the World Cup).
 Although the draw took place in June, FIFA rankings are shown as of February 2007, which accords with press reports of the rankings used in the draw seeding.

Squads

Group stage

Group A

Group B

Knockout stage

Semi-finals

Third Place Match

Final 

(Note): The three medallists, New Caledonia, Fiji, and Vanuatu, advanced to the 2008 OFC Nations Cup (together with automatic qualifier New Zealand).

Advancement questions

Tuvalu 
There remained some uncertainty as to what procedure would occur to Tuvalu advance - as they were not members of FIFA (and therefore did not enter the 2010 FIFA World Cup). While no explicit ruling was communicated on this matter, comments in the press release for the OFC Second Stage draw referred to "nine eligible nations", suggesting that Tuvalu would not have advanced to the OFC Nations Cup regardless of their performance in the South Pacific Games. Had Tuvalu finished in a medal position, the fourth place team would presumably have qualified for the next round of qualifying with the other two medal winners and New Zealand. Tuvalu's early elimination from the competition put an end to any complication over the qualifying process for the next round.

This was the first time ever that a non-FIFA nation has competed in the World Cup. The closest situation in the past was the case of New Caledonia during the 2006 World Cup qualifiers. However, they were at the time in the process of accession to the organisation, and were eliminated from contention for the finals just days before their final admission to the FIFA family.

Papua New Guinea 
Papua New Guinea, having initially entered the 2010 World Cup and indicated their intention to enter the South Pacific Games, were involved in a dispute with their sporting authorities and failed to meet the official accreditation deadline for the South Pacific Games. This meant they were effectively disqualified from the World Cup.

Goalscorers
There were 110 goals scored in 24 games, for an average of 4.58 goals per game.

Players in bold advanced to the next round.
10 goals
 Osea Vakatalesau

9 goals
 Seule Soromon

7 goals
 Commins Menapi

5 goals
 Iamel Kabeu

4 goals

 Roy Krishna
 Henry Fa'arodo
 Benjamin Totori
 Etienne Mermer
 François Sakama

3 goals

 Pita Baleitoga
 Pita Rabo

2 goals

 Teariki Mateariki
 Malakai Kainihewe
 Malakai Tiwa
 Taniela Waqa
 Pierre Wajoka
 Chris Cahill
 Desmond Fa'aiuaso
 Penitito Tumua
 Godwin Bebeu
 Alick Maemae
 Stanley Waita
 Pio Palu
 Richard Iwai
 Moise Poida

1 goal

 Ramin Ott
 Thomas La Mouton
 Kunda Tom
 Joasaia Bukalidi
 Peni Finau
 José Hmaé
 Yohann Mercier
 Poulidor Toto
 Damien Fonoti
 Junior Michael
 Lionel Taylor
 Judd Molea
 Samson Takayama
 Temarii Tinorua
 Axel Williams
 Unaloto Feao
 Lafeale Moala
 Malakai Savieti
 Kaisani Uhatahi
 Viliamu Sekifu
 Andrew Chichirua
 Victor Maleb
 Jean Nako Naprapol
 Tom Tomake

Own goals
 Stephen Willis (playing against Tuvalu)

See also 
Pacific Games
Football at the 2007 South Pacific Games – Women's tournament

References 

1
Football at the 2007 South Pacific Games
2007
Pac
2007 South Pacific Games